San Simón is the shire town of the municipality of Simón Rodríguez of Táchira, in Venezuela.

References

Populated places in Táchira